Tyurikovo is a rural locality (a village) in Vereshchaginsky District, Perm Krai, Russia.  The population was 170 as of 2010. There are 3  streets.

Geography 
Tyurikovo is located 10 km east of Vereshchagino (the district's administrative centre) by road. Strizhi is the nearest rural locality.

References 

Rural localities in Vereshchaginsky District